Salvador Caro Cabrera (born 21 November 1970) is a Mexican politician from the Citizens' Movement (formerly from the Labor Party). From 2009 to 2012 he served as Deputy of the LXI Legislature of the Mexican Congress representing Jalisco.

References

1970 births
Living people
Politicians from Guadalajara, Jalisco
Labor Party (Mexico) politicians
Citizens' Movement (Mexico) politicians
21st-century Mexican politicians
Deputies of the LXI Legislature of Mexico
Members of the Chamber of Deputies (Mexico) for Jalisco